Vasyl Yuriyovych Turyanchyk (17 April 1935 – 31 March 2022) was a Ukrainian football player and coach who played as a defender.

Honours
Dynamo Kyiv
 Soviet Top League: 1961, 1966, 1967, 1968
 Soviet Cup: 1964, 1966

Individual
 Ukrainian Footballer of the Year: 1967, 1968 (shared)

References

External links
Maxim Maximov.  50 лет победы. Василий Турянчик:  Для «Динамо» – всё, что угодно!. UA-Football. 26 April 2011.
Turyanchyk at kopanyi myach

1935 births
2022 deaths
People from Carpathian Ruthenia
Piddubny Olympic College alumni
Soviet footballers
Ukrainian footballers
Association football defenders
Soviet Top League players
FC Hoverla Uzhhorod players
SKA Lviv players
FC Dynamo Kyiv players
Ukrainian football managers
Soviet football managers
FC Hoverla Uzhhorod managers
FC Karpaty Mukacheve managers
Sportspeople from Zakarpattia Oblast